Ski patrol is an organization that provides Emergency Medical and rescue services to participants of on-snow sports such as cross-country skiing, skiing, snowboarding, etc., either at a ski area or in a backcountry setting. 

Ski Patrol may also refer to:

 Ski Patrol (1940 film), a 1940 American war film
 Ski Patrol (1990 film), a 1990 American film
 "Ski Patrol", an instructional video for new members of the ski patrol by Happy Tree Friends
 Ski Patrol (band)

See also 
 Military patrol, a winter sport from which olympic biathlon was developed